Zofijówka may refer to the following places:
Zofijówka, Kuyavian-Pomeranian Voivodeship (north-central Poland)
Zofijówka, Lublin Voivodeship (east Poland)
Zofijówka, Opole Voivodeship (south-west Poland)
Zofijówka, Warmian-Masurian Voivodeship (north Poland)